The 2017 UNAF U-17 Tournament is the 14th edition of the UNAF U-17 Tournament. The tournament took place in Rabat from 20 to 24 August 2017.

Participants

 (hosts)

Venue
Maamora sports centre, Salé

Tournament

Champions

References

2017 in African football
2017
2017
2017–18 in Algerian football
2017–18 in Moroccan football
2017–18 in Tunisian football
2017–18 in Libyan football